Rice Lake railway station is located at the unincorporated place of Rice Lake in Unorganized Kenora District in northwestern Ontario, Canada. The station is on the Canadian National Railway transcontinental main line, between the Manitoba border, just  to the west, and White to the east, and is used by Via Rail as a stop for transcontinental Canadian trains.

References

External links
 Rice Lake railway station

Via Rail stations in Ontario
Railway stations in Kenora District